Mohammad Hossein Gharavi Esfahani also known as Kumpani (1879-1942) was an Iraqi-Iranian Shia Scholar, philosopher, jurist and poet.

Early life and family 

He was born on 2 Muharram 1296 AH (1879) in Kadhimiya, Iraq.  He was the son of Mohammad Hassan who was originally from Nakhjavan, Iran.

Education

He gained his basic education from Hassan Tuyserkani and, aged twenty, migrated to Najaf to acquire knowledge.

Teachers
His teachers included Akhound Khorasani, Mohqiq, Muhammad esfahani, Mohammad Bagher Estahbanati, Ahmad Shirazi, Muhammad Tabatabaei Fasharaki, and Aqa Reza Hamadani.

Students

His students included: Mohammad Ali Araki (his son-in-law), Mohammad Ali Ordubadi, Nasrollah Eshkavari, Abdul Hosein Amini, anvari Hamadani, Mohammad Taqhi Bahjat, Yousef Biyari, Sadr Al din JAzaeri, Muhammad Rida al-Muzaffar, Hadi Milani, Hossein hamadani Najafi, Abu al-Qasim al-Khoei, Mohammad Hossein Tabatabaei, Mortaza Modrresi Chahardehi, sayyed hadi Khosrow Shahi, Abd al-A'la al-Sabziwari.

Works
His books include:
DISCUSSIONS IN PRINCIPLES (BOHOUS FI ELME OSUL) (DAFTER ENTESHARATE ISLAMI QOM, 1419 LUNAR HIGIRA
TREATISE ON BREAKFAST INF
EXALTED LIGHTS (AL ANVAR AL Qodsiyyah)
The Prize of man of wisdom (Tohfat Al Hakim) 
Notes on Makaseb
The end of understanding in principles (Nahayah Al-Derayah)

Death
He died in 1942 and was buried in Imam Ali's Shrine in Najaf City.

See also
 Contemporary Islamic philosophy
 Fiqh
 Islamic philosophy
 List of Islamic studies scholars

References

External links

 Muhammad Husayn Gharawi Isfahani

 محمدحسین غروی اصفهانی کمپانی (in Persian)
الشيخ محمد حسين الإصفهاني المعروف بالكُمباني (in Arabic)
الفقيه الأصولي الشيخ محمد حسين الغروي الأصفهاني “ره”.. ومضات من سيرته (in Arabic)
ومضات من سيرة الفقيه الكبير الشيخ محمد حسين الغروي الأصفهاني (in Arabic)
 شيخ محمد حسين غروي اصفهاني (in Persian)

1879 births
1942 deaths
Muslim scholars of Islamic jurisprudence
Iraqi people of Iranian descent
Iranian ayatollahs
Iraqi ayatollahs
Pupils of Muhammad Kadhim Khorasani
Iranian Muslim mystics